Ballyloughan Castle is a ruined castle and National Monument in County Carlow near Bagenalstown. A twin-towered gatehouse, the hall and foundations of one of the corner towers, dating to about 1300 remain.

History 
Ballyloughan is located on the western end of a glacial ridge near to Mount Leinster. The castle is roughly square in form, and the walls are in places up to 50ft high and 5ft thick. Nothing is recorded of the castles early history, though the majority of its features are typical of 13th century construction.

References

Notes

Sources 

Castles in County Carlow
National Monuments in County Carlow